The labor theory of property (also called the labor theory of appropriation, labor theory of ownership, labor theory of entitlement, or principle of first appropriation) is a theory of natural law that holds that property originally comes about by the exertion of labor upon natural resources. The theory has been used to justify the homestead principle, which holds that one may gain whole permanent ownership of an unowned natural resource by performing an act of original appropriation.

In his Second Treatise on Government, the philosopher John Locke asked by what right an individual can claim to own one part of the world, when, according to the Bible, God gave the world to all humanity in common. He answered that, although persons belong to God, they own the fruits of their labor. When a person works, that labor enters into the object. Thus, the object becomes the property of that person.

However, Locke held that one may only appropriate property in this fashion if the Lockean proviso held true, that is, "... there is enough, and as good, left in common for others".

Locke's formulation

Exclusive ownership and creation
Locke argued in support of individual property rights as natural rights. Following the argument the fruits of one's labor are one's own because one worked for it. Furthermore, the laborer must also hold a natural property right in the resource itself because exclusive ownership was immediately necessary for production.

Jean-Jacques Rousseau later criticized this second step in Discourse on Inequality, where he argues that the natural right argument does not extend to resources that one did not create. Both philosophers hold that the relation between labor and ownership pertains only to property that was significantly unused before such labor took place.

Enclosure vs mixing labor
Land in its original state would be considered unowned by anyone, but if an individual applied his labor to the land by farming it, for example, it becomes his property. Merely placing a fence around land rather than using the land enclosed would not bring property into being according to most natural law theorists.

For example, economist Murray Rothbard stated (in Man, Economy, and State):

Acquisition vs mixing labor
The labor theory of property does not only apply to land itself, but to any application of labor to nature. For example, natural-rightist Lysander Spooner, says that an apple taken from an unowned tree would become the property of the person who plucked it, as he has labored to acquire it. He says the "only way, in which ["the wealth of nature"] can be made useful to mankind, is by their taking possession of it individually, and thus making it private property."

However, some, such as Benjamin Tucker have not seen this as creating property in all things. Tucker argued that "in the case of land, or of any other material the supply of which is so limited that all cannot hold it in unlimited quantities, these should only be considered owned while the individual is in the act of using or occupying these things." This is a rejection of Absentee ownership for land.

Lockean proviso

Locke held that individuals have a right to homestead private property from nature by working on it, but that they can do so only "...at least where there is enough, and as good, left in common for others". The proviso maintains that appropriation of unowned resources is a diminution of the rights of others to it, and would be acceptable only so long as it does not make anyone worse off than they would have been before. The phrase "Lockean Proviso" was coined by political philosopher Robert Nozick, and is based on the ideas elaborated by John Locke in his Second Treatise of Government.

Criticism
Aside from critiques of natural rights as a whole, Locke's labor theory of property has been singled out for critique by modern academics who doubt the idea that mixing something owned with something unowned could imbue the object with ownership:

Jeremy Waldron believes that Locke has made a category mistake, as only objects can be mixed with other objects and laboring is not an object, but an activity.

Judith Jarvis Thomson points out that the act of laboring makes Locke's argument either an appeal to desert, in which case the reward is arbitrary-"Why not instead a medal and a handshake from the president?"-or little different than first possession theories that existed before Locke.

Ellen Meiksins Wood provides a number of critiques of Locke's labor theory of property from a Marxist perspective. Wood notes that Locke is not actually concerned with the act of labor or improving the use value of property, but rather is focused on the creation of exchange value as the basis of property. 

In addition to the theoretical deficiencies of Locke's theory of property, Wood also argues that Locke also provides a justification for the dispossession of indigenous land. The idea that making land productive serves as the basis of property rights establishes the corollary that the failure to improve land could mean forfeiting property rights. Under Locke's theory, "[e]ven if land is occupied by indigenous peoples, and even if they make use of the land themselves, their land is still open to legitimate colonial expropriation." Locke's notion that property "derives from the creation of value, from 'improvement' that enhances exchange value, implies not only that mere occupancy is not enough to establish property rights, or even that hunting-gathering cannot establish the right of property while agriculture can, but also that insufficiently productive and profitable agriculture, by the standards of English agrarian capitalism, effectively constitutes waste."

Economist John Quiggin argues that this fits into a larger fundamental criticism of Locke's labor theory of property which values a particular type of labor and land use (i.e. agriculture) over all others. It thus does not recognize usage of land, for example, by hunter-gatherer societies as granting rights to ownership. In essence, the Lockean proviso depends on "the existence of a frontier, beyond which lies boundless usable land. This in turn requires the erasure (mentally and usually in brutal reality) of the people already living beyond the frontier and drawing their sustenance from the land in question." Locke's theories of property rights are often interpreted in the context of his support for chattel slavery of "prisoners captured in war" as a philosophical justification for the enslavement of Black Africans and expulsion or killing of Native Americans by early American colonists to gain their land.

See also
 Entitlement theory
 First possession theory of property
 Georgism
 Homestead principle
 Propertarianism

References

Theories of law
Property
John Locke